Dianchicystis is an basal extinct genus of vetulocystids. It was found in Jianshan, near Haikou, Qiongzhusi Fm. (Cambrian from China).

Phylogeny

See also
Haikouichthys

References

Vetulocystidae
Cambrian genus extinctions